Alf Mats Bertil Johansson (born 26 August 1956) is a Swedish Olympic sailor who competed in the 1988 Summer Olympics, finishing 4th, and in the 2000 Summer Olympics, finishing 13th. He also skippered for the Victory Challenge Louis Vuitton Cup challenge and has bronze medal from the 1990 Star World Championships in Cleveland, Ohio.

Achievements

References

Swedish male sailors (sport)
Olympic sailors of Sweden
Sailors at the 1988 Summer Olympics – Star
Sailors at the 2000 Summer Olympics – Star
1956 births
Living people
2003 America's Cup sailors